Northacres Park is a  public park located in the Haller Lake neighborhood of Seattle, Washington, at the corner of Interstate 5 and N.E. 130th Street. It incorporates a large forested area with trails, a picnic area, a baseball diamond and soccer field, and an off-leash dog area. The park's playground and wading pool were remodeled and reopened in 2012. They include two play areas with equipment for children of different ages as well as a spray park. The park is also the site of one of only two remaining Civil Defense towers in the city, erected in 1954 to support a Chrysler Air-raid Siren. The siren, listed by Guinness World Records as the loudest ever constructed, is no longer operational.

External links
Parks Department page on Northacres Park

Parks in Seattle